The Church of St George is a Church of England parish church in Beckington, Somerset, England. It is a Norman church, dating from the 14th century. It has been designated as a Grade I listed building.

History
Although the first recorded rector was Matrin de Sutton, installed in 1411, the church is at least Norman in origin, with possibly a previous Saxon past. The diagonally buttressed four stage tower is broadly unaltered from the Norman period.

A number of alterations have occurred over the years, such as in the early 17th century, when it gained a Jacobean screen and communion table, as well as a memorial to the poet Samuel Daniel, who died in the parish in 1619. Further notable alterations occurred in the 18th century, when the nave was reroofed (1754) and two new bells placed in the tower (1756), which were cast by Thomas Bilbie of the Bilbie family. The original six bells were recast and two extras added as part of the restoration of the tower in 1906.

The churchyard contains a number of graves, including the war grave of a Royal Artillery soldier of World War II.

Present day
The Anglican parish is part of the benefice of Beckington with Standerwick, Berkley, Lullington, Orchardleigh and Rodden within the archdeaconry of Wells.

See also

 List of Grade I listed buildings in Mendip
 List of towers in Somerset
 List of ecclesiastical parishes in the Diocese of Bath and Wells

References

External links

14th-century church buildings in England
Grade I listed churches in Somerset
Church of England church buildings in Mendip District
Grade I listed buildings in Mendip District
Conservative evangelical Anglican churches in England